Dungannon Aerodrome  is a registered aerodrome located  south of Dungannon, Ontario, Canada.

References

Registered aerodromes in Ontario